Trouble in Mind is an album released by American singer Hayes Carll in 2008. The album debuted at number 18 of the Top Heatseekers chart.

Track listing 
Songs written by Hayes Carll unless otherwise stated.

 "Drunken Poet's Dream" (Hayes Carll, Ray Wylie Hubbard) – 3:28
 "It's a Shame" – 3:46
 "Girl Downtown" – 3:27
 "Bad Liver and a Broken Heart" (Scott Nolan) – 4:22
 "Beaumont" – 3:26
 "I Got a Gig" – 4:00
 "Faulkner Street" – 3:25
 "Wild as a Turkey" – 2:28
 "Don't Let Me Fall" (Carll, Jonny Burke) – 3:45
 "A Lover Like You" – 4:22
 "I Don't Wanna Grow Up" (Tom Waits, Kathleen Brennan) – 3:36
 "Knockin' Over Whiskeys" – 2:53
 "Willing to Love Again" (Carll, Darrell Scott) – 3:26
 "She Left Me for Jesus" (Carll, Brian Keane) – 4:02

Personnel

 Hayes Carll – Lead vocals, acoustic guitar, Baritone acoustic guitar
 Al Perkins – Pedal steel guitar, Banjo, Dobro, Lap steel guitar
 Brad Jones – Bass guitar, Vibraphone, Electric guitar, Baritone electric guitar, Organ, Piano, Harmonium, Nylon string acoustic guitar
 John Gardner – drums, percussion
 Pat Buchanan – Electric guitar, Acoustic guitar, Harmonica, Bass guitar
 Will Kimbrough – Baritone electric guitar, Banjo, Electric guitar
 Fats Kaplin – Dobro, Lap steel guitar, Pedal steel guitar, Violin, Mandolin
 Brad Fordham – Bass guitar
 George Bradfute – Baritone electric guitar
 Lisa Pankratz – Drums
 Thad Cockrell – Background vocals
 Dan Baird – Electric guitar, Background vocals
 Carey Kotsionis – Background vocals
 Carl Broemel – Electric guitar
 Darrell Scott – Weisenborn slide guitar, Background vocals
 Chris Carmichael – Violin
 Robert Kearns – Background vocals

References

2008 albums
Hayes Carll albums
Lost Highway Records albums